NGC 1935 (also known as ESO 56-EN110 and IC 2126) is an emission nebula  which is part of the larger LMC-N44 nebula in the Dorado constellation. NGC 1935 is also located in the Large Magellanic Cloud. It was discovered by John Herschel in 1834 and added to the  Catalogue of Nebulae and Clusters of Stars as NGC 1935, then was observed by Williamina Fleming in 1901 and later added to the Index Catalogue as IC 2126.

References

External links
 

Emission nebulae
ESO objects
IC objects
Dorado (constellation)
Astronomical objects discovered in 1834
1935
Large Magellanic Cloud